Hechtia lyman-smithii is a species of plant in the genus Hechtia. This species is endemic to Mexico.

References

lyman-smithii
Flora of Mexico
Plants described in 1987